The political opening of Brazil was the 1974–1988 period of liberalization under the country's military regime, ending with the decline of the regime, the signing of the country's new constitution, and the transition to democracy. General Ernesto Geisel began the liberalization (distensão) in 1974 by allowing for the Brazilian Democratic Movement opposition party's participation in congressional elections. He worked to address human rights violations and began to undo the military dictatorship's founding legislation, the Institutional Acts, in 1978. General João Figueiredo, elected the next year, continued the transition to democracy, freeing the last political prisoners in 1980, instituting direct elections in 1982. The 1985 election of a ruling opposition party marked the military dictatorship's end. The process of liberalization ultimately was successful.

The democratization's historiography shows disagreement as to whether the opening was spurred more by divisions among the country's elite or by pressure from civil society, including church grassroots, new unionism, and opposition voters.

See also
History of Brazil since 1985

References

Bibliography

Further reading 

 
 
 
 

Political history of Brazil
Military dictatorship in Brazil
1970s in Brazil
1980s in Brazil
Democratization